Ipswich Girls' Grammar School (IGGS) is an independent, non-denominational, day and boarding school for girls, in Ipswich, Queensland, Australia.

The school is one of the eight original 'Queensland Grammar Schools'. These schools are independent, non-denominational, not-for-profit statutory bodies of the Queensland Government. They are not linked to, administered, or governed by any religious organisation or specific style of education.

Both boys and girls are taught until year 6 at Ipswich Junior Grammar School situated on the Girls' School campus. Years 7 and above are girls only. The boarding school starts at year 5.

The school is a member of the Queensland Girls' Secondary Schools Sports Association (QGSSSA).

Some of the Ipswich Girls' Grammar School Buildings are listed on the Queensland Heritage Register.

Ipswich Junior Grammar School
The Head of the Junior School is Nicolee Eiby, who is assisted by Deputy Head, Andrea
Ferrando . The Junior School educates 2 year olds in the Early Education Centre through to Year 6. Year 7 is part of the middle school system. The Junior School, with the assistance of the P&F, organises many co-curricular activities, such as gymnastics, school dances and music and drama lessons. For most purposes, the Junior School is distinct from the Senior School, and conducts its own assemblies and organises its own activities. However, some facilities on the IGGS/IJGS campus are shared by both the Junior and Senior Schools, such as the gymnasium, swimming pool, hall and oval, and the School newsletter is published for all students from Prep to Year 12. The Junior School also provides many events both in and outside of school like interhouse swimming, cross country and athletics, cross country training, public speaking and holds evenings for parents and students to get together like music showcases and performances.

House system
The school is split into 5 houses, named after the first five school headmistresses.

  Hunt - named for Fanny E. Hunt BSc. - 1892 - 1902
  Connell - named for Maud Connell MA - 1902 - 1905
  White - named for Helen White MA - 1906 - 1927
  Armitage - named for Lillian M. Armitage MA - 1928 - 1947
  Carter - named for Katherine C. Carter MBE MA - 1948 - 1964

In these houses, the students participate in athletics, drama, music, art, debating and more.

Campus
The School's campus is located in central Ipswich, and features a mixture of historic buildings dating to its inception in 1892 and more modern facilities which have been added over the years. The buildings are spread around the campus, interspersed with many green areas and gardens. Facilities include the performing arts block, state-of-the-art graphics and art studios, gymnasium, swimming pool and specialised language classrooms.

New buildings

Following a devastating fire that destroyed the science block in the Senior School on 27 August 2005, IGGS has embarked on a major building program. Two new buildings have been constructed, after several years of negotiations undertaken by the School’s Board of Trustees and Executive; these buildings cost over $20 million and were completed by the beginning of the 2009 school year. 

The new five level Senior School building includes replacement of the Senior classrooms and Science laboratories destroyed by the fire plus additional facilities including administration and student services area, an auditorium and function room. The four level Junior School building has increased enrolment capacity with 12 new classrooms, a new library and computer rooms.

Notable people
Students:
Estelle Cribb, first woman to take a degree of Master of Arts in Mathematics at Sydney University
Zora Cross - poet, novelist and journalist
Dakota Davidson - AFL Women's player
Deb Frecklington, Member of the Queensland Legislative Assembly
Violet Gibbons, principal of Osborne College in the Blue Mountains
Eleanor Constance (Ella) Greenham, first Queensland-born women to graduate a medical degree
Bronwyn Harch - research statistician, academic
Vi Jordan - the second woman to be elected to the Queensland parliament
Kate Lutkins - National team member for Aussie Rules football.
Rachel Nolan - the youngest woman elected to the Queensland parliament
Violet Rudkin, artist
Teachers:
 Caroline Barker, artist, taught art at the school 1921-1922

See also
List of schools in Queensland

References

External links

Girls' schools in Queensland
Boarding schools in Queensland
Educational institutions established in 1892
Nondenominational Christian schools in Queensland
Junior School Heads Association of Australia Member Schools
Schools in Ipswich, Queensland
East Ipswich, Queensland
1892 establishments in Australia
Alliance of Girls' Schools Australasia